Francisco Vargas Ramirez is a Puerto Rican boxer. At the 2012 Summer Olympics, he competed in the Men's light welterweight, but was defeated in the first round.

References

Year of birth missing (living people)
Living people
Olympic boxers of Puerto Rico
Boxers at the 2012 Summer Olympics
Welterweight boxers
People from Río Piedras, Puerto Rico
Puerto Rican male boxers